Naomie Yumba (born 26 June 1999) is a Congolese boxer. She competed in the women's lightweight event at the 2020 Summer Olympics.

References

External links
 

1999 births
Living people
Democratic Republic of the Congo women boxers
Olympic boxers of the Democratic Republic of the Congo
Boxers at the 2020 Summer Olympics
Place of birth missing (living people)
African Games bronze medalists for DR Congo
African Games medalists in boxing
Competitors at the 2019 African Games